Anowara, also written Anwara, is an upazila of Chattogram District in Chattogram Division, Bangladesh.

Geography
It has 38,008 households  and a total area of 164.13 km2.

Demographics
As of the 1991 Bangladesh census, Anwara has a population of 2132468543525. Males constitute 50.99% of the population, and females 49.01%. This Upazila's eighteen up population is 107408. Anwara has an average literacy rate of 30.6% (7+ years), and the national average of 32.4% literate. It has lot of rich men who were born there and almost all of them live in the city of Chittagong .

Administration
Anwara Upazila is divided into 11 union parishads: Anowara, Bairag, Barakhain, Barasat, Burumchhara, Battali, Chatari, Haildhar, Juidandi, Paraikora, and Roypur. The union parishads are subdivided into 85 mauzas and 81 villages.

Chairman : Towhidul Hoq Chowdhury (from Awami League)

Member : Abdur Rahaman Khan (from Dudhkumra Awami League)

Woman Vice Chairman : Morium Begum (From Awami League)

Vice Chairman :Mrinal kanti dhor (from Awami League)

Upazila Nirbahi Officer (UNO) : Sheikh Jobaer Ahmed

Members of ninth and tenth Parliament (2009 -2014 & 2014- )
Chittagong-12 (Anwara Upazila) Seat 289: Saifuzzaman Chowdhury Zabed,  [from Awami League], Director of United Commercial Bank Limited (UCBL). He was elected as member of the parliament after his father's (Aktaruzzaman Chowdhury Babu, a Presidium member of Bangladesh Awami League) who died on Nov 4, 2012.

See also
Upazilas of Bangladesh
Districts of Bangladesh
Divisions of Bangladesh

References

Anwara Upazila